Loutros (Greek: Λουτρός) is a village in the southern part of the Evros regional unit in Greece. It is part of the municipal unit of Traianoupoli. Its population in 2011 was 713 for the settlement and 769 for the community, including the villages Loutra Traianoupoleos (thermal baths) and Pefka. It is located on a small river between low hills, east of Alexandroupoli, on the edge of the coastal plains of the Aegean Sea.

Population

See also
List of settlements in the Evros regional unit

External links
Loutros on GTP Travel Pages

References

Populated places in Evros (regional unit)